The St. George Antiochian Orthodox Church is an Antiochian Orthodox church across from Lake Eola, in Orlando, Florida.

The church building was originally the First Church of Christ, Scientist. Originally built in 1927, the building was added to the National Register of Historic Places on June 3, 1980. The Church of Christ, Scientist congregation now holds services at 915 North Ferncreek.

Current function
St. George Antiochian Orthodox Church is under the Antiochian Orthodox Christian Archdiocese of North America and the Very Reverend Father John E Hamatie is the Presiding Priest.

Gallery

See also
 List of Former Christian Science Churches, Societies and Buildings

References

External links

 Orange County listings at Florida's Office of Cultural and Historical Programs

Churches in Orlando, Florida
History of Orlando, Florida
Churches on the National Register of Historic Places in Florida
National Register of Historic Places in Orange County, Florida
Former Christian Science churches, societies and buildings in Florida
Orthodox Church in America churches
Eastern Orthodoxy in Florida